Samson Road is a major east–west street in Caloocan, northern Metro Manila, Philippines. The road is a continuation of Epifanio de los Santos Avenue (EDSA), linked to it via the Bonifacio Monument Roundabout (Monumento) to form a single through route. These roads form part of Circumferential Road 4 (C-4) of the Metro Manila's arterial road network, National Route 120 of the Philippine highway network, and Asian Highway 26 of the Asian highway network.

Samson Road is named for Apolonio Samson, a Katipunan barrio lieutenant from Sitio Kangkong, Balintawak, Caloocan (now part of Quezon City) who fought alongside Andres Bonifacio during the Philippine Revolution.

Route
Samson Road, the main road in South Caloocan, officially begins at the Bonifacio Monument Circle (Monumento), the junction with EDSA, MacArthur Highway and Rizal Avenue Extension, and ends at the junction with A. Mabini and Marcelo H. Del Pilar Streets. At its eastern terminus, it runs between Araneta Square Mall and Puregold Monumento (on the northwest corner of Rizal Avenue and Samson Road) and SM Hypermarket Monumento (on the southwest corner of MacArthur Highway and Samson) at Monumento. For much of its length, the road is generally commercial, with a mix of high-density residential zones as well as a few schools. Notable sites along the road are the University of the East Caloocan (formerly UE Tech), SM Center Sangandaan, and the Caloocan railway station. It is also the home of the University of Caloocan City and the Philippine National Railways Hospital (Col. Salvador T. Villa Memorial Hospital). At its western terminus, it continues west as Gen. San Miguel Street.

History

Samson Road, formerly called as Calle Samson, used to reach as far as near Malabon to the west and San Francisco del Monte in the present-day Quezon City to the east. It comprised the segments currently known as Gen. San Miguel Street, EDSA (from Monumento to Balintawak), and apparently the Old Samson Road that reached Sitio Kangkong, where its namesake hailed from. Its section west of Mabini and Del Pilar, now Gen. San Miguel Street, used to be the right-of-way alignment of tranvia's Manila–Malabon line until 1945. It became part of the Manila Circumferential Road (present-day EDSA; Highway 54 or Route 54) until the 1950s. It was later made part of Circumferential Road 4, when the proposal for the Metro Manila Arterial Road System was done in the late 1960s.

References

Streets in Metro Manila